Arcadia is an unincorporated community in Davidson County, North Carolina, United States. It is located in the northwestern section of the county along NC Highway 150. Neighboring communities and municipalities include Midway, Welcome and Winston-Salem.

History
The area was, in previous years, highly agricultural. However, this has changed due to an increase in housing development and the decreased viability of small scale agriculture. Small farms are not totally eradicated though, examples being Robana Farms and Twin Cedar Farm.

Hampton House was added to the National Register of Historic Places in 1984.

Education
Arcadia is the location of Northwest and Friedberg Elementary Schools, both part of the Davidson County School System.  The two schools feed into North Davidson Middle and North Davidson High (both in Welcome).

Fire Department
Arcadia is served by the A-RC-H (Arcadia-Reedy Creek-Hampton) Volunteer Fire Department, the Midway Volunteer Fire Department, as well as the Griffith Volunteer Fire Department which is located on Peters Creek Pkwy in Forsyth County.

Development
Arcadia is mostly a residential community with a few commercial establishments, and a declining number of farms.  There is a mixture of businesses including:  retail chains, such as Ace Hardware and Food Lion. Local businesses such as North Davidson Autoparts; and restaurants such as Arcadia Q Barbecue, Steven's Restaurant, on Highway 150 - South of Winston-Salem, Arcadia Family Restaurant and Pizzeria, Hong Kong Chinese Restaurant, Subway, Hungry Howies Pizza, McDonald's, and Sheetz (A fast food, gas station, convenience store hybrid). The area is, however, beginning to grow as Winston-Salem expands.

Much of the community's vacant land is being excavated for housing development, as many attempt to escape higher property taxes in nearby Forsyth County.

References

Unincorporated communities in Davidson County, North Carolina
Unincorporated communities in North Carolina